John Fane, 9th Earl of Westmorland (5 May 1728 – 25 April 1774), known as Lord Burghersh until 1771, was an English peer and Member of Parliament.  

He was the eldest son of Thomas Fane, 8th Earl of Westmorland of Wormsley Park, Buckinghamshire and educated at Westminster School (1739–45). His younger brother was Henry Fane, MP.

He succeeded his father as MP for Lyme Regis from 1762 (passing the seat on to his brother Henry in 1771).

Lord Burghersh
In 1764 Joshua Reynolds painted his full-length portrait entitled Lord Burghersh. Reynolds was paid 100 guineas for the work which depicted the subject wearing blue, embroidered with gold, in a landscape with the family seat, Apethorpe Hall, in the background. In May 1903 the portrait was sold to Martin Colnaghi for 1,250 guineas.

In 1771 he inherited the titles and estates of his father and took his seat in the House of Lords.

Marriages and issue
His first wife was Augusta Bertie, daughter of Lord Montague Bertie, whom he married on 26 March 1758. They had three children: 
 John Fane, 10th Earl of Westmorland (1 June 1759 – 15 December 1841)
 Hon. Thomas Fane (6 July 1760 – 15 April 1807), married Anne Lowe in 1789 and had issue
 Lady Augusta Fane (18 September 1761 – 6 March 1838), married William Lowther, 1st Earl of Lonsdale

His second wife was Susan Gordon, daughter of Cosmo George Gordon, 3rd Duke of Gordon and Lady Catherine Gordon. They married on 28 May 1767, and had three children:
 Lady Susan Fane (3 October 1768 – 8 March 1793), married John Drummond, 12th of Lennoch and 5th of Megginch in 1788, brother of General Sir Gordon Drummond and Lady Hervey.
 Lady Elizabeth Fane (7 January 1770 – 19 May 1844), married William Lowther's brother Sir John Lowther and had issue.
 Lady Mary Fane (19 September 1772 – 27 June 1855), married George Fludyer, MP, younger son of Sir Samuel Fludyer, 1st Baronet, in 1792 and had issue.

His widow Susan remarried to Colonel John Woodford in 1778, at St Marylebone Parish Church, London  and their issue included Alexander George Woodford.

References

External links
John Fane, 9th Earl of Westmorland at thePeerage.com

1728 births
1774 deaths
18th-century English nobility
People educated at Westminster School, London
Members of the Parliament of Great Britain for English constituencies
British MPs 1761–1768
British MPs 1768–1774
John
Earls of Westmorland
Barons Burghersh